Dirk is a male given name of Dutch origin. It is a traditional diminutive of the Dutch name: Diederik. The meaning of the name is "the people's ruler", composed of þeud ("people") and ric ("power"). Dirk may also be a surname. It is cognate to French Thierry, German Dietrich and Gothic Theoderic.

It may refer to:

People with the given name 

 Dirk I, Count of Holland (died 944)
 Dirk II, Count of Holland (944–988)
 Dirk III, Count of Holland (died 1039)
 Dirk IV, Count of Holland (1020–1049)
 Dirk V, Count of Holland (1052–1091)
 Dirk VI, Count of Holland (1114–1157)
 Dirk VII, Count of Holland (died 1203)
 Dirk Bach (1961–2012), German actor
 Dirk Bauermann (born 1957), German basketball coach
 Dirk Benedict (born 1945), American actor
 Dirk Bezemer (born 1971), Dutch economist
 Dirk Bikkembergs (born 1959), Belgian fashion designer
 Dirk Blocker (born 1957), American actor
 Dirk Bolt (1930–2020), Dutch-born architect
 Dirk Bootsma (1936–2020), Dutch geneticist
 Dirk Brouwer (1902–1966), American astronomer
 Dirk Brossé (born 1960), Belgian composer
 Dirk Bruinenberg (born 1968), Dutch musician 
 Dirk Coster (1889–1950), Dutch physicist
 Dirk Crabeth (1501–1574), Dutch artist
 Dirk Cussler (born 1961), American writer
 Dirk Dirksen (1937–2006), American music promoter 
 Dirk Elbers (born 1959), German politician
 Dirk Fock (1858–1941), Dutch politician
 Dirk Frimout (born 1941), Belgian astronaut and astrophysicist 
 Dirk Gates (born 1961), American businessman
 Dirk Geukens (1963–2020), Belgian motocross racer
 Dirk Hartog (1580–1621), Dutch sailor and explorer
 Dirk Hayhurst (born 1981), American author
 Dirk Jan de Geer (1870–1960), Dutch politician and prime minister
 Dirk Jan Struik (1894–2000), Dutch mathematician and historian
 Dirk Johnson (born 1975), American football player
 Dirk Kemp (born 1913), South African football player
 Dirk Kempthorne (born 1951), American politician 
 Dirk Koetter (born 1959), American football coach 
 Dirk Kuyt (born 1980), Dutch football player
 Dirk Mädrich (born 1983), German basketball player
 Dirk Mudge (1928–2020), Namibian politician
 Dirk Müller (artist) (born 1946), Dutch sculptor
 Dirk Müller (cyclist) (born 1973), German cyclist
 Dirk Müller (racing driver) (born 1975), German race car driver
 Dirk Nannes (born 1976), Australian cricket player
 Dirk Niebel (born 1963), German politician
 Dirk Nowitzki (born 1978), German basketball player
 Dirk Polder (1919–2001), Dutch physicist 
 Dirk Schlächter (born 1965), German bassist 
 Dirk Stikker (1897–1979), Dutch politician and diplomat
 Dirk Stoop (1615–1686), Dutch painter 
 Dirk Valkenburg (1675–1721), Dutch painter
 Dirk van Erp (1860–1933), American coppersmith
 Dirk van Braeckel (born 1958), Belgian car designer
 Dirk de Waard (1919–2011), Dutch-born American geologist
 Dirk Willems (died 1569), Dutch Anabaptist martyr and pacifist
 Dirk Wilutzky (born 1965), German film maker 
 Dirk DeFord Stud in adult films

People with the nickname 

 Dirk Bogarde (1921–1999), stage name of British actor Derek van den Bogaerde
 Stewart "Dirk" Fischer (1924–2013), American composer and musician
 Richard Dirk Gringhuis (1918–1974), American artist and illustrator
 Derrick Dirk Meyer (born 1961), American businessman
 Gerald Dirk West (1930–1996), American editorial cartoonist and journalist
 Dirk from Veristablium, nickname of Derek Muller

People with the surname 

 Robert Dirk (born 1966), Canadian ice hockey player

Other uses

Fictional characters with the name 

 Dirk the Daring, the main character in the video game Dragon's Lair
Dirk Dagger (also known as Dirk Spanner), the main character in the video game Dirk Dagger and the Fallen Idol
 Dirk Diggler, the main character in Boogie Nights played by Mark Wahlberg
 Dirk Gently, the main character in Dirk Gently's Holistic Detective Agency by Douglas Adams
Dirk McQuickly, the equivalent of Paul McCartney in The Beatles parody band The Rutles
 Dirk Pitt, the main character in novels by Clive Cussler
Dirk Strider, a character from the webcomic Homestuck
 Dirk Struan, the main character in James Clavell's 1966 novel Tai-Pan
 Dirk (Bizaardvark character), a main character on Disney Channel's Bizaardvark

See also 

 
 
 Dirck, given name
 Dirks (surname)

Dutch masculine given names
English masculine given names
German masculine given names
Irish masculine given names
Scottish masculine given names

Lists of people by nickname